Dyson's eternal intelligence concept (the Dyson Scenario), proposed by Freeman Dyson in 1979, proposes a means by which an immortal society of intelligent beings in an open universe may escape the prospect of the heat death of the universe by extending subjective time to infinity even though expending only a finite amount of energy.

Bremermann's limit can be invoked to deduce that the amount of time to perform a computation on 1 bit is inversely proportional to the change in energy in the system. As a result, the amount of computations that can be performed grows over time. The increase in energy available slows logarithmically, but never stops. Therefore, for any specific computation rate that requires a specific amount of energy, there will come a time when that energy is available to be used.

The intelligent beings would begin by storing a finite amount of energy. They then use half (or any fraction) of this energy to power their thought. When the energy gradient created by unleashing this fraction of the stored fuel was exhausted, the beings would enter a state of zero-energy-consumption until the universe cooled. Once the universe had cooled sufficiently, half of the remaining half (one quarter of the original energy) of the intelligent beings' fuel reserves would once again be released, powering a brief period of thought once more. This would continue, with smaller and smaller amounts of energy being released. As the universe cooled, the thoughts would be slower and slower, but there would still be an infinite number of them. 

In 1998, it was discovered that the expansion of the universe appears to be accelerating rather than decelerating due to a positive cosmological constant, implying that any two regions of the universe will eventually become permanently separated from one another. Dyson noted that "in an accelerated universe everything is different".

Legacy
Frank J. Tipler has cited Dyson's writings, and specifically his writings on the  eternal intelligence, as a major influence on his own highly controversial Omega Point theory.
Tipler's theory differs from Dyson's theory on several key points, most notable of which is that Dyson's eternal intelligence presupposes an open universe while Tipler's Omega Point presupposes a closed/contracting universe.  Both theories will be invalidated if the observed universal  expansion continues to accelerate.

See also

References

Physical cosmology
Freeman Dyson